Mohamed Ouzzine (born 5 January 1969) is a Moroccan politician of the Popular Movement. He was the Minister of Youth and Sports in Abdelilah Benkirane's government from 2012 to 2015. Previously he was Secretary of State for Foreign Affairs from 2009 to 2012. He holds a degree in sociolinguistics.

See also
Cabinet of Morocco
Popular Movement

References

External links
Ministry of Youth and Sports

Living people
Government ministers of Morocco
1969 births
Moroccan sociologists
Linguists from Morocco
People from Azrou
Popular Movement (Morocco) politicians